In the Book of Mormon, the brother of Jared is the most prominent person in the account given in the beginning (Chapters 1–6) of the Book of Ether. The brother of Jared's name is not given in the text of the Book of Mormon but Joseph Smith stated in 1834 that it was Mahonri Moriancumer.

In the Book of Mormon

Tower of Babel 
According to the Book of Ether, Jared and his brother were present at the Tower of Babel. When the language of the people was confounded, Jared asked his brother to ask God not to confound their own language, that of their friends, and that of their immediate families.

Land of Moriancumer 
After being granted to have their language not confounded, they asked to be led to where the Lord would have them go in the hope that it would be a choice land. They were led through the wilderness, across many waters, to the "great sea which divides the lands" and then dwelt in tents at the seashore for four years. They named the place that they had temporarily settled Moriancumer. The account relates that after four years, the Lord came to the brother of Jared and "chastened him because he remembered not to call upon the name of the Lord."

Journey to the Promised Land 
The brother of Jared was then instructed to build "barges" or boats. After building the boats, the brother of Jared worried about how the insides of the boats would be lit during their journey across the sea.

The Lord told the brother of Jared that he should figure out a way to light the boats, and so the brother of Jared produced sixteen stones from molten rock, two for each ship, and they were white and clear, just like transparent glass. The brother of Jared then asked the Lord to touch each stone he had made so that they would shine in the darkness. The Lord touched each stone with his finger.

The brother of Jared watched as the Lord did so and fell to the ground in fear. The Lord then revealed to the brother of Jared that he had seen his spirit (his premortal spirit body), even as he would appear in the flesh (as Jesus in his mortal ministry). The brother of Jared was then told to write down what he saw in his own language (Adamic), which no one would understand, and that his record would be revealed after Christ had been lifted upon the cross. (When Mosiah interpreted the 24 gold plates found by the people of Limhi, and read this account, he was instructed that these things were not to be revealed until after his people had been visited by Christ.)

The account continues to relate that the Jaredites, as they came to be known, boarded the boats, and were driven by the wind until they arrived at the "promised land."

In the Promised Land
When Jared became old, he and his brother gathered their descendants to count them: the brother of Jared had 22 descendants, the oldest male being named Pagag. Jared had four sons (Jacom, Gilgah, Mahah, and Orihah) and eight daughters who are mentioned but unnamed.

The Jaredite people wanted a king appointed. The brother of Jared was opposed to the idea but ultimately relented and asked the people the choose a king from among his and Jared's sons. All of the brother of Jared's sons refused the position, as did Jared's older sons, but Jared's youngest son, Orihah, accepted. Jared and the brother of Jared died during the reign of Orihah.

Name 
In an 1835 letter Oliver Cowdery parenthetically gives the name of the brother of Jared as "Moriancumer," which appears in the Book of Ether in the Book of Mormon only as a place name. A later account describes an 1834 statement by Joseph Smith in which he said that the brother of Jared's name had been revealed to him as "Mahonri Moriancumer":

Etymologies have been proposed but remain largely speculative.

According to Daniel H. Ludlow, it is not clear why the name of the brother of Jared does not appear in the Book of Mormon. However, the following are possible reasons:
 The brother of Jared may have omitted his name out of modesty (John the Beloved did essentially the same thing in the Gospel of John, which he wrote).
 The Book of Ether is clearly a family record of Jared, not the brother of Jared; Ether, the final writer and perhaps the abridger of the record, was a descendant of Jared and might naturally have emphasized the achievements of his direct ancestor rather than the brother of his ancestor.
 Moroni may have omitted the name in his abridgment because of difficulty in translating (or "transliterating") the name into the Nephite language.
 In the Roman practice of damnatio memoriae, names were intentionally removed from the record. Egyptian factions also wiped out names and statues of heretical rivals. In Ether 11:17–18, a direct descendant of the Brother of Jared, and rival king, is also not named.

See also
 List of names for the biblical nameless
 Lineage of Ether
 Mahonri Young, American sculptor named after the brother of Jared

References

Further reading

External links
 Henry B. Eyring, "The Brother of Jared: An Expert at Learning", Ensign, July 1978
 Book of Mormon Seminary Student Study Guide (2000)
 Chapter 48, Book of Mormon Student Manual (1996)

Book of Mormon prophets
Book of Mormon words and phrases